Outbreak Company, known in Japan as  is a Japanese light novel series written by Ichirō Sakaki, with illustrations by Yūgen. Kodansha published 18 volumes from December 2011 to August 2017. A manga adaptation by Kiri Kajiya was serialized in Kodansha's Good! Afternoon magazine. An anime television series adaptation by Feel aired between October and December 2013.

Plot
Shinichi Kanou is a young secluded otaku who is offered a job thanks to his vast knowledge of anime, manga, and video games.  However, just after meeting his new employer, he is kidnapped, awakening in an alternate world with a fantasy setup. Shinichi is then informed that he was in fact selected by the Japanese government to help improve his country's relations with this new world by establishing a company to spread the unique products of the Japanese anime culture to this new, unexplored market.

Characters

Shinichi is the protagonist. He is a hardcore high school aged otaku who is true and honest to his interests. Shinichi learned the hardships of being an otaku after confessing to his childhood friend, where she denied him, just because he was an otaku. He was so depressed, that he dropped out of school and became a NEET for a year, before his parents gave him a choice, rejoin society or be disowned. Having little choice, he looked for a job in order to escape the hikikomori lifestyle. He found a fishy job for otaku and took it and as a result he ends up employed in spreading otaku culture for the Holy Eldant Empire. Shinichi has romantic feeling for Myusel and confesses to her at the end of the series.

Myusel is a half-elf who is Shinichi's maid in the Holy Eldant Empire. Due to her half-elf nature, she is disdained by both elves and humans as half-breeds like her are looked down upon. For that reason, Myusel often hides her elf ears. Having no discrimination at her origins, she then began showing them whilst in the mansion when Shinichi found out about her heritage and praised Myusel for it, calling them attractive instead of ridiculing her. Shinichi quickly befriends Myusel and starts teaching her the Japanese language. Myusel often thinks of herself as a lowly servant and often talks down about her self, however Shinichi did not see Myusel for her class and treated her as an equal. In response to his kindness, Myusel eventually falls in love with him and becomes his most trusted supporter. Myusel is a powerful mage who was trained in the Eldant military. She officially becomes his girlfriend/love interest after he confesses to her at the end of the series.

Despite looking like a child, Petralka is actually sixteen years old and is the monarch of the Eldant Empire. She takes an interest in Shinichi after seeing how casually he speaks with her and after learning about otaku culture. Petralka starts visiting him on a regular basis to have him read manga for her which in turn causes her to develop deep feelings for him. Petralka usually complains at Myusel out of jealousy due to her closeness with Shinichi and how well she learned to speak and write in Japanese. Not wanting to fall behind a "lowly peasant", she asks him to teach her the Japanese language as well. Petralka usually demands attention from Shinichi, and only him. She tends to give Shinichi a leery look whenever he fawns over girls who are obviously much better endowed than she is and often assumes any request he asks of her must stem from a sexual motive.

A well-endowed female member of the Self-Defence Forces. She is another one of the ambassadors from Japan, assigned to serve as both a bodyguard and an advisor for Shinichi. She is part of the Japan Ground Self Defense Eastern Regiment First Engineering Group JSDF, Ranked as First Class there. She is assigned to help Shinichi with his task of spreading the otaku culture in the Eldant. Minori is also an otaku but unlike him, she is a fujoshi specialized in boys-love merchandise and usually fantasizes about Shinichi with Garius becoming a couple. For the sake of being recognized by her own father, she started training early in her childhood, attributing to her impressive battle prowess. This is also one of the reasons why she entered the JSDF. Minori is an accomplished fighter and is capable of defeating a group of armed vigilantes without the need of a weapon.

A werewolf who has large dog ears and a large chest. Elvia was initially recruited by the neighboring Bahailm Kingdom to spy on Eldant. She apologises a lot more due to the fact that she constantly falls victim to her natural animalistic tendencies and causing trouble than any other reason. Elvia is a great artist and is able to sketch large-scaled castles and structures with ease. Elvia develops a crush on Shinichi after she is saved by him when she was captured and about to be executed. She is later entrusted as Shinichi's personal artist. During the full moon, Elvia has a tendency to forget herself and act much more doglike, like jumping on Shinichi and licking his face when she's happy or chasing a ball on all fours while barking. Elvia once attacked Shinichi at night while she was in heat because of it. She has a tendency to glomp Shinichi whenever he makes a statement about not minding her race.

The man from the Japanese government who hires Shinichi to the task of spreading the Japanese culture in Eldant. However, he only reveals him the true nature of his mission after having him drugged and taken away from Earth.

Petralka's cousin, knight, and the captain of her guard. He is initially incredulous and dismissive of Shinichi's mission at first, but later warms up to him and comes around to enjoying it. His and Petralka's parents fought for the throne which ended with their mutual deaths, leaving Petralka to become a ruler despite being a child. Thanks to Minori's influence, Garius becomes interested in BL manga (boys-love) and developed interest in Shinichi.

Media

Light novels
Outbreak Company is a light novel series written by Ichiro Sakaki, with illustrations by Yūgen. Kodansha published 18 volumes from December 2, 2011 to August 2, 2017 under their Kodansha Ranobe Bunko imprint. The novels are published in Taiwan by Sharp Point Press. North American online light novel publisher J-Novel Club have licensed the series.

|}

Manga
A manga adaptation, illustrated by Kiri Kajiya, was serialized in Kodansha's Good! Afternoon magazine between November 7, 2012, and November 7, 2014. Kodansha published the series in four tankōbon volumes from September 2, 2013 to January 7, 2015.

|}

Anime
An anime television series adaptation, produced by Feel and directed by Kei Oikawa, aired from October 3 to December 19, 2013, on TBS and later on MBS, CBC, and BS-TBS. The anime was simulcasted in North America by Crunchyroll. Sentai Filmworks acquired the anime series for streaming and home video release, later releasing it on Blu-ray and DVD on March 3, 2015.

References

External links
 Outbreak Company at Kodansha 
 Anime official website 
 

2010s fantasy novels
2011 Japanese novels
2013 Japanese television series endings
Anime and manga based on light novels
Comedy anime and manga
Feel (animation studio)
Ichirō Sakaki
Isekai anime and manga
Isekai novels and light novels
J-Novel Club books
Japanese fantasy novels
Japan Self-Defense Forces in fiction
Kodansha manga
Kodansha Ranobe Bunko
Light novels
Mainichi Broadcasting System original programming
Seinen manga
Sentai Filmworks
Sharp Point Press titles
Television shows based on light novels
TBS Television (Japan) original programming